Dunham's Sports is an American sporting goods retail chain owned by Dunham's Athleisure Corporation, with stores located in the Midwestern to Southeastern United States.  The chain specializes in athletic equipment, clothing, firearms, and other sports-related items. The chain has over 240 locations in 24 states, including Alabama, Arkansas, Georgia, Illinois, Indiana, Iowa, Kansas, Kentucky, Maryland, Michigan, Minnesota, Missouri, Nebraska, North Carolina, North Dakota, Ohio, Oklahoma, Pennsylvania, South Dakota, Tennessee, Virginia, West Virginia, Wisconsin and Wyoming.

History
The first store opened in West Bloomfield Township, Michigan in 1937 as Dunham's Bait & Tackle. It was operated by Ron Dunham on Northwestern Highway west of Telegraph Road. The original store gained exposure through advertisements in Newsweek and fishing shows hosted on radio. The original store burnt down in 1946 but was promptly rebuilt.

R. L. Schmalzreid bought the store in 1953 and relocated it to the corner of Northwestern Highway and Orchard Lake Road. American Can Company acquired the chain in 1985. At the time of the acquisition, the chain had eight stores: five in Metro Detroit, one in Grand Rapids, Michigan, one in Anderson, Indiana, and one in Muncie, Indiana. After merging with Primerica, the company sold off Dunham's in 1989. By 1991, the company had 49 stores and was headquartered in Waterford Township, Michigan. Dunham's Sports is currently headquartered in Troy, Michigan.

References

External links
 

1937 establishments in Michigan
American companies established in 1937
Companies based in Troy, Michigan
Economy of the Midwestern United States
Economy of the Southeastern United States
Privately held companies based in Michigan
Retail companies established in 1937
Sporting goods retailers of the United States